The R702 road is a regional road in Ireland which runs west-east from the R712 at Coolgrange in County Kilkenny through Gowran before crossing into County Carlow at Goresbridge. 
It continues to Borris, passes through the Blackstairs Mountains via the Scullogue Gap into County Wexford and continues east until it terminates at a junction with the R890 in Enniscorthy.

The official description of the R702 from the Roads Act 1993 (Classification of Regional Roads) Order 2019  reads:

R702: Coolgrange — Gowran, County Kilkenny — Enniscorthy, Co. Wexford

Between its junction with R712 at Coolgrange and its junction with R448 at Main Street Gowran via Gallowshill all in the county of Kilkenny

and

between its junction with R448 at Gowran Demesne in the county of Kilkenny and its junction with R890 at Duffry Gate at Enniscorthy in the county of Wexford via Grange Lower; High Street and Bridge Street at Goresbridge; in the county of Kilkenny: Ballyellin, Ballyteiglea, Borris, Barmona, Kyle, Ballymurphy, Rathgeran and Coonogue in the county of Carlow: Kiltealy, Wheelagower, Monart West, Milehouse; and Bellfield Road at Enniscorthy in the county of Wexford

See also
Roads in Ireland
National primary road
National secondary road

References

Roads Act 1993 (Classification of Regional Roads) Order 2019 – Department of Transport

Regional roads in the Republic of Ireland
Roads in County Kilkenny
Roads in County Carlow
Roads in County Wexford